Severe Tire Damage may refer to:

 Signs warning of spike strips
 Severe Tire Damage (band), a rock band
 Severe Tire Damage (album) by They Might Be Giants